The La Plata derby (Clásico Platense or Clásico de La Plata in Spanish) is one of the most fiercely contested derbies in Argentine football. It is played between local clubs Estudiantes and Gimnasia y Esgrima. 

The first official derby took place as part of the 1916 Argentine Primera División championship on August 27, 1916. On that occasion, Gimnasia won 1–0 over Estudiantes, with an owngoal by Ludovico Pastor.

The largest victory in a derby was on October 15, 2006, when Estudiantes thrashed Gimnasia by 7-0 in the 11th fixture of the 2006–07 season.

According to several studies related to social research in football, La Plata is one of the few cities in the country where the local clubs surpass Boca Juniors and River Plate in number of supporters. The other cities are Rosario, Santa Fe, Córdoba, Rafaela and San Miguel de Tucumán.

History
Since their first meeting, both clubs have played 180 matches, including not only Primera División games but domestic cups and international tournaments such as Copa Sudamericana.

Estudiantes won 66 times (260 goals), while Gimnasia y Esgrima achieved 50 wins (213 goals), with 64 draws. Since the 2006 Clausura, the La Plata derby was held in Estadio Ciudad de La Plata, where Estudiantes remained unbeaten after 15 matches played, with 10 wins and 5 draws. The first match at Estadio Unico was played on February 12, 2006.

Statistics
Updated as of 28 Nov, 2020.

Data amateurism and other national tournaments scheduled from RSSSF.
''¹²³ Gimnasia was awarded the victory by the abandonment of the players of Estudiantes.

Players to have played for both clubs
 Héctor Antonio
 Carlos Bertero 
 Antonio García Ameijenda
 Gerardo González 
 Ricardo Infante
 Daniel Pighín
 Gastón Sessa
 Héctor Vargas
 Enrique Vidallé

Highlights

Estudiantes 
On July 1, 1917 Estudiates won the derby match for the first time by a score of 3-0.
On September 13, 1930 Estudiantes won the last amateur game between the clubs by a score of 4-1.
On March 13, 1932 Estudiantes won 6-1 to record their biggest win in the derby, a record that stood for 74 years.
On November 17, 1940 Estudiantes recorded a 4-1 away win.
On September 5, 1948 Estudiantes equalled their record win, beating Gimnasia 6-1.
On August 5, 1967 Estudiantes won 3-0 to end a run of three consecutive 0-0 draws in league fixtures between the clubs.
On June 7, 1968 Estudiantes won 6-1 away to record the biggest ever away win in the derby.
On November 27, 1971 Estudiantes won 5-1.
On October 15, 2006 Estudiantes inflicted the heaviest derby defeat in the history of the fixture, winning 7-0.
On December 13, 2006 Estudiantes beat Boca Juniors in a championship playoff game, winning the title despite the efforts of some Gimnasia fans who had threatened their own team into losing against Boca,  in order to damage Estudiantes chances of winning the title.
Estudiantes won five consecutive league derbies starting 15 October 2006. As of the beginning of the 2009 Clausura championship, this streak is still ongoing.

Gimnasia y Esgrima 
On August 27, 1916 Gimnasia won the first ever La Plata derby
On June 25, 1963 Gimnasia won 5-2 at home.
On November 11, 1970 Gimnasia won 4-1 in the Nacional avenging a 4-1 defeat earlier in the season.
In 1993 Gimnasia beat Estudiantes 1-0 on aggregate on their way to winning the Copa Centenario.
On April 24, 2003 Gimnasia won 4-2.

References

Argentine football rivalries
Estudiantes de La Plata
Gimnasia La Plata